The 2019 Kwibuka Women's T20 Tournament was a women's T20I cricket (WT20I) tournament held in Rwanda from 18 to 23 June 2019. This was the sixth edition of the annual Kwibuka T20 Tournament, first organised in 2014 in remembrance of the victims of the 1994 Genocide against the Tutsi.

The participants were the women's national sides of Rwanda, Uganda, Mali and Tanzania, with the latter two teams making their first appearance in the tournament while defending champions Kenya withdrew due to lack of funding. This was the first time in the tournament's history that the matches were recognised as official WT20I games as per ICC's announcement to provide full WT20I status to all the matches played between the associate teams after 1 July 2018. All the matches were played at the Gahanga International Cricket Stadium in Kigali. Kenya had previously won the title three times (2015, 2017, 2018) while Uganda had won it twice, the inaugural edition in 2014 and also in 2016. Tanzania Women won this year's edition by winning all of their matches and thus remaining unbeaten, while two Ugandan players, Rita Musamali and Joyce Apio became the highest run scorer and wicket taker respectively.

In the 2nd match of the tournament, the Mali women's team was bowled out for six runs in nine overs by the hosts Rwanda, making it the lowest team total in a completed WT20I match. The Rwandan side chased down the target of seven runs in just four balls to win the match by ten wickets with 116 balls to spare. In the fifth match of the tournament against Mali, Uganda went on to score 314/2 in 20 overs, making it the highest team total in Women's Twenty20 internationals. It was the first time in a T20 international cricket match, male or female, that a team had scored 300 runs. The Mali team were bowled out for 10 runs in 11.1 overs, the second lowest team total in WT20Is. The margin of victory (304 runs) was also the biggest ever in a WT20I match.

The seventh edition of the tournament was scheduled to take place in June 2020, but was postponed until the following year due to the COVID-19 pandemic.

Squads

Round-robin

Points table

Matches

References

External links
 Series home at ESPN Cricinfo

Cricket in Rwanda
2019 Kwibuka Women's T20 Tournament
Rwanda in international cricket
2019 in women's cricket
Associate international cricket competitions in 2019